Bryggja is a village in southwestern part of Stad Municipality in Vestland county, Norway. It is located on the mainland, along the northern shore of the Nordfjorden. The small village of Totland lies just west of Bryggja.

History
On 1 January 2020, the Totland - Maurstad - Bryggja areas were transferred from Vågsøy Municipality to the newly created Stad Municipality.

Notable residents
 Alfred Maurstad (1896 in Bryggja – 1967) an actor, movie director and theatre manager 
 Audun Endestad (born 1953 in Bryggja) a Norwegian-American Olympic cross-country skier

References

Villages in Vestland
Stad, Norway